Phil Byrne may refer to:

 Philip Byrne (born 1982), Irish footballer for Carrick Rangers
 Phil Byrne (hurler) (1874–?), Irish hurler for Tipperary

See also
Philly Byrne, musician with Gama Bomb
Phil Byrnes, character in After the Thin Man
Philip Burne-Jones